Lauryl glucoside is a surfactant used in cosmetics and laundry detergents.  It is a glycoside produced from glucose and lauryl alcohol.

See also
 Decyl glucoside
 Octyl glucoside

References

Glucosides
Non-ionic surfactants